Trevor Patrick Taylor (26 December 1936  – 27 September 2010) was a British motor racing driver from England.

Early career
Trevor Taylor was born in Sheffield, the son of a garage owner from Rotherham. He began his racing career in  Formula Three racing, initially in a Staride and later a Cooper-Norton. Ten victories in 1958 earned him the British Formula Three Championship. After a frustrating year in 1959 spent with his own Formula Two Cooper, he received an invitation to run his Lotus 18 as a second works car for 1960. He finished equal first in the Formula Junior championship with Jim Clark, although he competed in two more races that counted towards the championship than Clark who was already driving regularly for Team Lotus in Formula One. Taylor went on to win the title on his own account in 1961. At the end of 1961, Taylor got a regular Formula One drive with Team Lotus and proved competitive with Clark and Moss in the South African series in December 1961.

Formula One career

Taylor participated in 29 World Championship Formula One Grands Prix, qualifying for 27 of them. He made his debut on 18 July 1959, in the British Grand Prix held that year at Aintree, driving a privately entered 1.5-litre Cooper T51 but did not qualify. In 1961, he was thirteenth at that year's Dutch Grand Prix, his only World Championship drive that year. He was second in the 1962 Formula One season opening Dutch Grand Prix, his only World Championship podium finish. He led early in the Belgian Grand Prix at Spa and after his team leader Clark passed he engaged in a duel with Willy Mairesse who was driving before his home crowd. Following in Taylor's slip steam, Mairesse clipped the extension of Taylor's gearbox going uphill from Stavelot, the Ferrari 156 having more power uphill, and while neither suffered serious injury both were lucky to survive the high speed encounter. Taylor said that while, Mairesse generally tried too hard and was over eager for Championship honours, on this occasion, Mairesse was driving well and with precision and it was not his fault.

At the end of 1962, Taylor shared with Jim Clark the car and victory in the non-championship Mexican Grand Prix had a win and a second place at two non-championship events in South Africa confirming his place with Team Lotus in 1963. However, after a handful of top-three-finishes in non-championship events, his best World Championship result was sixth place in the opening race at Monaco, and thereafter he was rarely competitive, although on the fast Reims circuit, in the French Grand Prix, he was running second when he retired at two-thirds distance. Taylor admitted his confidence was shaken by two serious accidents at Spa and Enna-Pergusa. Team owner Colin Chapman suggested Taylor take a sabbatical after the end of the 1963 season and then return to Lotus. Taylor differed and attempted to continue as an F1 driver. After an unsuccessful season with the British Racing Partnership in 1964, Taylor withdrew from Formula One competition.

During his career he achieved one podium finish, and scored a total of eight championship points. He also participated in numerous non-Championship Formula One races during this time and won three, including one shared with Clark, in 1962 and 1963. Taylor is credited with inventing the yellow stripe that ran down the middle of Team Lotus cars during the 1960s.

After 1964 Taylor enjoyed lesser forms of racing, and tested a Cosworth Formula One car in 1969 which was entered for Grands Prix but did not race. In that, the opening year of F5000, Trevor Taylor was a strong contestant in the Guards Championship, winning F5000 rounds in a Surtees TS5 in the Netherlands, Denmark, Germany and Ireland and finished runner up to Peter Gethin in the 1969 F5000 series.

Taylor died at the age of 73 after contracting cancer.

Complete Formula One World Championship results 
(key)

Non-Championship results
(key) (Races in bold indicate pole position)
(Races in italics indicate fastest lap)

 Win shared with Jim Clark, who took over the car after being disqualified for a push start.

References

External links

 Trevor Taylor profile at The 500 Owners Association

British Formula Three Championship drivers
English racing drivers
English Formula One drivers
Racing drivers from Yorkshire
Team Lotus Formula One drivers
British Racing Partnership Formula One drivers
Shannon Formula One drivers
European Formula Two Championship drivers
1936 births
2010 deaths
24 Hours of Le Mans drivers
Deaths from cancer in the United Kingdom
World Sportscar Championship drivers